The Queen's Gallery is the main public art gallery of Buckingham Palace, home of the British monarch, in London. It exhibits works of art from the Royal Collection (the bulk of which works have since its opening been regularly displayed, so held in trust for the nation, rather than kept privately) on a rotating basis. It has its own access façade and typically displays about 450 works, always including mainly paintings and drawings.

Building history
The gallery forms the most protruding south wing of the Palace. Its entrance/exit is on the site of a chapel bombed during the Second World War. The gallery opened in 1962; in the next 37 years the gallery received 5 million visitors, until its closure in 1999 (1999 to 2002) for expansion. The expansion, was commissioned from architect John Simpson. On 21 May 2002, the gallery was reopened by Elizabeth II to coincide with her Golden Jubilee. The expansion made the Doric entrance portico, new rooms, and more than tripling in size. It is open to the public during the day for most of the year.

Exhibitions
From May to October 2019, the Queen's Gallery housed an exhibition of 200 of Leonardo da Vinci's drawings from the Royal Collection

See also

List of museums in London
Royal Collection

References

Fisher, Mark (2004). Britain's Best Museums and Galleries. London: Penguin.

External links
The Queen's Gallery, Buckingham Palace on Royal Collection site

Royal buildings in London
Art museums and galleries in London
1962 establishments in England
Museums in the City of Westminster
Buckingham Palace
Art museums established in 1962
Elizabeth II